George Eugene Uhlenbeck (December 6, 1900 – October 31, 1988) was a Dutch-American theoretical physicist.

Background and education

George Uhlenbeck was the son of Eugenius and Anne Beeger Uhlenbeck. He attended the Hogere Burgerschool (High School) in The Hague, from which he graduated in 1918.

He subsequently entered Delft University of Technology as a student in chemical engineering. During the next year, he transferred to the Leiden University, to study physics and mathematics, and he earned his bachelor's degree in 1920 (Dutch: Kandidaatsexamen). Uhlenbeck was then admitted by Ehrenfest (a student of Boltzmann's) to the Wednesday evening physics colloquium in Leiden. Ehrenfest became the most important scientific influence in his life. From 1922 to 1925 Uhlenbeck was the tutor of the younger son of the Dutch ambassador in Rome. While there, he attended lectures by Tullio Levi-Civita and Vito Volterra and met his longtime friend, Enrico Fermi. In 1923, Uhlenbeck received his master's degree from Leiden (Dutch: Doctoraalexamen).

He returned to Leiden in 1925 to become Ehrenfest's assistant. Ehrenfest assigned him to work with his graduate student, Samuel Goudsmit for a quick update on "what was currently happening in physics". In mid-September 1925, Uhlenbeck and Goudsmit introduced electron spin, which posits intrinsic angular momentum for the electron. In 1927 Uhlenbeck earned his Ph.D. degree under Ehrenfest with his thesis titled: "Over Statistische Methoden in de Theorie der Quanta" ("On Statistical Methods in the Quantum Theory" ).

Uhlenbeck married Else Ophorst in Arnhem, Netherlands in August 1927. He received a doctorate from the Leiden University in the same year.

Career
In 1927, Uhlenbeck took a position as an instructor in physics at the University of Michigan in Ann Arbor, Michigan. He stayed there until 1935, when he succeeded H. A. Kramers as a professor of theoretical physics in Utrecht. During his eight years in Ann Arbor, Uhlenbeck organized the noted "Summerschool" in theoretical physics.

In 1938, Uhlenbeck spent half a year as visiting professor at Columbia University in New York City, and then he returned to Ann Arbor as a professor of theoretical physics during the next year.  Because of the rise of Nazism in Europe, he and Else decided to leave his position in the Netherlands and return to America.

During part of World War II, from 1943 through 1945, Uhlenbeck led a theory group at the Radiation Laboratory in Cambridge, Massachusetts, which was doing radar
research. In 1945, he returned to Ann Arbor, where he was named the Henry Smith Carhart Professor of Physics in 1954. He remained in Ann Arbor until 1960, when he joined the Rockefeller Institute for Medical Research (now the Rockefeller University) in New York City as a professor and member of the institute.

Uhlenbeck developed the physical theory of the Ornstein-Uhlenbeck process.

Retirement and death
He retired in 1971, but remained scientifically active until the early 1980s.

Uhlenbeck died on October 31, 1988, in Boulder, Colorado, at the age of 87.

Recognition
Uhlenbeck received five honorary degrees. In addition, he received the Research Corporation award in 1953, the Oersted Medal of the American Association of Physics Teachers in 1955, the Max Planck Medal of the German Physical Society in 1964, the Lorentz Medal of the Royal Netherlands Academy of Arts and Sciences in 1970, the National Medal of Science in 1977, along with Goudsmit, and the Wolf Prize in Physics in 1979.

In 1951 he became member of the Royal Netherlands Academy of Arts and Sciences. He was elected to the United States National Academy of Sciences in 1955, the American Philosophical Society in 1957, and the American Academy of Arts and Sciences in 1964.

Uhlenbeck was a friend of many of the great physicists and mathematicians of his era, including Enrico Fermi and Oskar Klein. E.G.D. Cohen, a student of Uhlenbeck's, described his teacher:

... [Uhlenbeck] often admonished me that rather than trying to be original, it was much more important to be clear and correct and to summarise critically the present status of a field in the Ehrenfest tradition. He wisely observed that what is often of lasting value is not the first original contribution to a problem, but rather the final clearly and critically written survey. That is certainly what he did in this Brownian motion paper!

Describing Uhlenbeck's work, Cohen writes:

Uhlenbeck's papers are all relatively short and stand out by their conciseness, precision, and clarity, finely honed to a deeper understanding of a basic problem in statistical physics. They do not contain long formal derivations and are almost all geared to concrete problems. ... they were of a classic nobility, mathematical purity and clarity ... He felt that something really original one did only once – like the electron-spin--the rest of one's time one spent on clarifying the basics.

Cohen also comments on the high quality of Uhlenbeck's teaching:

He was an inspiring teacher. With superbly organised and extremely clear lectures, he laid bare for everyone to see the beautiful structure of statistical mechanics, based on the principles of the founding fathers, Maxwell, Boltzmann, and Gibbs. Thus he transmitted to a younger generation what he conceived to be the essence of the past and the way to the future. In doing so, he educated several generations of physicists in statistical mechanics in a style rare in this century.

See also
Ornstein–Uhlenbeck process

References

External links

 K. van Berkel, Uhlenbeck, George Eugène (1900–1988), in Biografisch Woordenboek van Nederland.
 
 S.A. Goudsmit. The discovery of the electron spin
 

20th-century Dutch physicists
1900 births
1988 deaths
Probability theorists
Fellows of the American Physical Society
Members of the Royal Netherlands Academy of Arts and Sciences
National Medal of Science laureates
Lorentz Medal winners
Wolf Prize in Physics laureates
Columbia University faculty
University of Michigan faculty
Dutch emigrants to the United States
People from Batavia, Dutch East Indies
20th-century American physicists
Winners of the Max Planck Medal
Presidents of the American Physical Society
Members of the American Philosophical Society